Danielle Faraldo (born June 21, 1966) is an American independent filmmaker.

External links
55th DGA Awards 
Filmmaker Reference
FT. Lauderdale Film Festival
 

1966 births
American television directors
American women television directors
Living people
Place of birth missing (living people)